Thug Walkin' is the debut studio album by American rap duo Ying Yang Twins from Atlanta, Georgia. It was released on April 25, 2000 via Collipark/Universal Records. The album peaked at #54 on the Top R&B/Hip-Hop Albums, #15 on the Heatseekers Albums and #10 on the Independent Albums.

Track listing

Charts

References

External links

2000 debut albums
Ying Yang Twins albums
Universal Records albums
Albums produced by Mr. Collipark